In molecular biology, snR54 is a non-coding RNA that is a member of the C/D class of snoRNA which contain the C box motif (UGAUGA) and  D box motif (CUGA). Most of the members of the box C/D family function in directing site-specific 2'-O-methylation of substrate RNAs. This snoRNA was first identified by a computational screen followed by experimental verification. This RNA guides the 2'-O-methylation of 18S rRNA. In yeast this snoRNA is found to reside in an intron of the IMD4 gene.

Species distribution 

This snoRNA has been identified in both yeasts and Drosophila melanogaster.

References

External links 
 
 Entry for snR54 in the UMASS Amherst Yeast snoRNA database

Small nuclear RNA